Bagmane Tech Park is a software technological park in India. The park is situated at CV Raman Nagar in Bengaluru. This park is built and maintained by Bagmane Group. The park shares its boundaries with HAL and DRDO and is near the HAL Airport. It is equipped with all modern class facilities and is surrounded by a lake near the entrance.

The park is home to some of the most prominent companies in world like Boeing India Pvt Ltd etc., Alstom Transport, CommVault Systems, Netserv Technologies, Informatica, Cypress Semiconductor, Dover Corporation, HSBC, Motorola, Hewlett Packard Enterprise, Sapient Corporation, Grant Thornton India, Oracle Financial Services Software Limited, HP, Juniper Networks, Ericsson, Lenovo, Texas Instruments, LinkedIn, MphasiS, Sasken, Micro Focus, Cognizant Technology Solutions, Ogilvy, Volvo, Dell, Tecnotree, Concur Technologies, PwC, BankBazaar, CME Group, Palo Alto Networks, Campus Management Corp.

The park consists of 10 large buildings.

References

External links
 The Official Website for Bagmane group

Software technology parks in Bangalore